Bevan Spencer von Einem (born 29 May 1946) is a convicted child murderer and suspected serial killer from Adelaide, South Australia. An accountant by profession, he was convicted in 1984 for the murder of 15-year-old Adelaide teenager Richard Kelvin, the son of local television and radio personality Rob Kelvin. von Einem is serving life imprisonment.  He was in G Block of Yatala Prison for decades but was transferred to Port Augusta Prison in the north of the state in 2007.

Early public image 
Von Einem first came to attention on the night of 10 May 1972 when two gay men were thrown into the River Torrens by a group of men believed to be police officers. The river bank was a popular beat where gay men would meet covertly, as homosexual acts were illegal in South Australia at that time. One of the men, Dr. George Duncan, a British lecturer in law who had arrived in Australia only seven weeks before, was drowned. The other, Roger James, suffered a broken leg and after crawling to the road was rescued by von Einem, who was driving past. Von Einem then took James to Royal Adelaide Hospital, where he recovered from his injuries.

Criminal history

Murder of Richard Kelvin 
Richard Dallas Kelvin (1 December 1967 – c. 10 July 1983), was the son of Rob Kelvin, a long-time television news presenter for Adelaide station NWS 9. Kelvin was murdered by von Einem on or around 10 July 1983 in Adelaide, South Australia after having been abducted, held captive, sexually abused, drugged and tortured for five weeks. Kelvin was 15 years old at the time of his death.

At approximately 6:15pm on 5 June 1983, von Einem (likely along with other unknown persons) abducted Kelvin near the intersection of Margaret Street & Peppertree Lane, North Adelaide, just 60 metres from Kelvin's home around the corner in Ward Street. Kelvin had just seen off a friend at a nearby bus stop on the corner of O'Connell and Marian Streets, North Adelaide after they had earlier that afternoon played football in a nearby park and was expected to return home immediately for dinner. A witness, a security guard living in Margaret Street, had heard cries for help, car doors slamming, and a car with a noisy exhaust speeding away. Kelvin also had a dog collar around his neck, which may have attracted von Einem's attention.

Despite a wide-ranging search by police, extensive media coverage that included a full page missing person poster in The Advertiser on 28 June (that unfortunately had contained a false lead given by the public to police), a $5,000 reward offered by the State Government two days after his disappearance (quickly raised to $15,000 a week later) and numerous tips and possible sightings provided by the public in the weeks after, Kelvin's whereabouts were unknown until his clothed body was found seven weeks later by a geologist searching for moss rocks with his family on 24 July 1983 alongside a dirt airstrip near One Tree Hill in the Adelaide Hills area (to the north-east of the city and close to where relatives of von Einem lived). Little effort was put into concealing Kelvin's body; he was found wearing the same Channel 9 shirt, blue jeans and white Adidas sneakers which he wore on the day of his abduction, together with the dog collar fitted around his neck. His body had been washed prior to being re-dressed and was found placed in the fetal position, with his legs bent towards his chest and his head forwards and his arms wrapped around his legs. This made police suspect that Kelvin had been dumped by a single person, most likely after nightfall in order to avoid detection.

The autopsy revealed that Kelvin had most likely died from massive blood loss from an anal injury, probably caused by the insertion of a blunt object with a tapered neck, such as a beer bottle, and that he had suffered bruising and injuries from blows to his head, to the left side of his back and also to his right buttock as well as a fractured front tooth which occurred either just before or just after death. Analysis of Kelvin's bloodstream revealed traces of alcohol and five hypnotic drugs, Mandrax, Noctec, Amytal, Valium and Rohypnol. With Mandrax being regulated by the Central Board of Health in 1978 stocks for it in Australia had declined somewhat by 1983 and police began sifting through prescriptions for that drug in particular. During their search they found a prescription for Mandrax issued to a 'B. von Einem', a name familiar to police as he had been questioned previously over the deaths of three young men and the alleged sexual assault of another.

Four days after Richard Kelvin's body was discovered, von Einem was questioned by the police about the murder. He initially claimed that he had not seen Kelvin and had no knowledge of his whereabouts and stated that on the night of abduction he had been in bed with the flu and was off work for the next week. Police also searched his home in the northern Adelaide suburb of Paradise, and seized a bottle of Mandrax. Von Einem admitted that the drugs were his and said that he used them to help him sleep. He denied having any other drugs in his possession, but police also seized a bottle of Noctec, concealed on a ledge behind his wardrobe. von Einem also allowed police to take hair and blood samples, as well as carpets and other materials for testing.

There were three major factors in von Einem's initial questioning that led police to become increasingly suspicious that they had found their prime suspect:

 When police knocked on von Einem's door and enquired about whether they could ask him a few questions, his immediate reaction was to say that he would not answer anything without speaking to his lawyer first. This made police suspect that he had something to hide.
 When questioned about the Kelvin murder, rather than profusely denying any involvement, von Einem simply said that he would not do such a thing because it would be "unethical". This came across as a strange thing for an innocent person to say.
 When asked about drugs, von Einem did admit he had Mandrax. He was asked if he kept any other drugs in his possession, and he said no. However, the police then found the bottle of Noctec and von Einem immediately became nervous and told police that he "rarely used those drugs".

As von Einem went on holiday to the Soviet Union and the United Kingdom during August and September 1983, the case against him began to mount up. Forensic investigators were able to match the many fibres found on Kelvin's clothing to those taken from von Einem's home, along with hairs found which matched those belonging to him. Forensics also determined that Kelvin was murdered between 8 July and 11 July 1983 and was dumped at the airstrip no later than the 11th. However, police raids on various locations around Adelaide linked to von Einem and his associates yielded few clues. Police also searched for a man who had previously claimed to police during the investigation of the unsolved murder of Alan Barnes in 1979 that von Einem had been involved in his death and also that he was a former associate of von Einem. Barnes's fatal injuries mirrored those of Kelvin closely. The man, known as "Mr. B", was located and informed police in great detail how he and von Einem had picked up young male hitchhikers, had given them alcoholic drinks laced with hypnotic drugs, and had taken them to von Einem's previous home in the Adelaide suburb of Campbelltown, where the young men had been abused overnight and released the next day. "Mr B" also provided further information about other associates of von Einem, but claimed he took no part whatsoever in any murders. Police also questioned other people whom von Einem had associated with, but they volunteered little information. With enough evidence, along with the information given by "Mr B", to indicate that Kelvin was at von Einem's home around the time of his death, police arrested and charged von Einem with murder on 3 November 1983. von Einem still denied ever coming into contact with Kelvin.

The committal hearing to determine if there was sufficient evidence for von Einem to stand trial for murder began on 20 February 1984. Faced with irrefutable evidence from prosecutors that Kelvin had been in his company, von Einem suddenly changed his story to answer that evidence and admitted that he had been in contact with Kelvin on the night of 5 June 1983. von Einem said that he was driving along O'Connell Street in North Adelaide looking for a parking spot in order to buy some fish and chips for dinner. While looking for a parking spot in a side street, von Einem said that he had nearly run over Kelvin as he jogged in from his side. von Einem stated he thought Kelvin had bisexual tendencies and said that the two of them then had a conversation about problems Kelvin had been having at school, and Kelvin willingly got into the car and they drove to von Einem's home. This answered the question of how fibres from von Einem's carpet had got onto Kelvin's clothes. To answer evidence about how fibres from von Einem's bed had come to be on Kelvin's clothes, von Einem stated that the two of them had sat on his bed and played with the large gold harp which he kept in his bedroom. Police previously did see this harp in his room when they seized the drugs. Finally, to answer evidence about how fibres from von Einem's cardigan had got onto Kelvin, von Einem stated that he had put his arm around Kelvin and hugged him because Kelvin was upset about how his peers had been bullying him at school. With all the fibres being accounted for with his new story, von Einem concluded his statement by saying that Kelvin had stayed for two hours before von Einem dropped him off in the Adelaide CBD near the Royal Adelaide Hospital and gave Kelvin $20 to pay for a taxi home.

Despite the intricate details of von Einem's alibi and his version of events, his story had two huge problems. It completely contradicted his initial statement of his whereabouts on 5 June 1983, when he said he had been in bed with the flu. Furthermore, the quantity of fibres on Kelvin's clothes was far too large to suggest that Kelvin was in his company for only two hours. Given these facts, on 25 May 1984, Magistrate Nick Manos ordered von Einem to stand trial for the murder of Kelvin.

The trial 
The trial against von Einem for the murder of Kelvin opened at the Supreme Court Building of South Australia on 15 October 1984 before Mr. Justice White. A jury of 12 people (seven women and five men) was selected and agreed upon by the prosecution and defence. Von Einem pleaded not guilty; his defence was led by barrister Barry Jennings, who was assisted by Helena Jasinski, who had been von Einem's solicitor from the start of the police investigation of him in the murder during the previous year. The prosecution was led by Brian Martin QC (later the Chief Justice of the Supreme Court of the Northern Territory), with assistance from Paul Rofe QC (who went on to be Director of the Department of Public Prosecutions). For the prosecution, it was a matter of proving von Einem's guilt (along with that of unknown persons) by presenting the strong scientific evidence that had been gathered during the investigation, and disproving von Einem's story of being in contact with Kelvin on the night of 5 June 1983. For the defence, it was a case of trying to make von Einem's story hold up in court, and raising doubts about his ability to keep Kelvin captive for five weeks and committing the murder.

The prosecution opened their case with the jury being taken to the various sites around Adelaide that were important in the trial, and over the first week they called various witnesses to the stand. Kelvin's parents, girlfriend and best friend were called to testify that Kelvin was an average 15-year-old who would not willingly get into a car with a stranger, was heterosexual with no homosexual or bisexual tendencies, and that he had been wearing the dog collar as a joke. People living close to the Kelvins then testified that they had heard noises and commotion corresponding to the abduction taking place on the night of 5 June at around 6pm. Forensic pathologists were called to testify about the injuries to Kelvin's head and anus, and the likely cause of his death, and pharmacists gave evidence of the excessive amount of different hypnotic drugs which von Einem had been prescribed (5872 tablets and capsules of six different brands of drugs between 15 December 1978 and 10 August 1983), and showed that von Einem had often had prescriptions for drugs issued from three different chemists on the same day or during the same weeks. Various police officers who worked on the case testified to their investigation of von Einem since they had first questioned him about the murder, as well as their visit to von Einem's home, where a police officer claimed that von Einem's bedroom appeared to have been cleaned "extensively".

Forensic scientists were called next to give evidence first on when Kelvin had died and when his body had been dumped in the Adelaide Hills area, and a leading entomologist claimed, from the larvae cycle of flies that were on the body, and comparing these to the larvae cycle of flies on a dead dog that was nearby, that Kelvin's body must have been dumped beside the airstrip near Kersbrook on 10 July 1983. Other forensic scientists were called to testify about the hair and fibre samples collected that were linked to von Einem himself and his home. Hairs from von Einem were found on and inside Kelvin's clothing and of 925 fibre samples found on Kelvin's clothing, 250 came from von Einem's home environment, with just seven from Kelvin's home. The scientists stated that if von Einem's story was true, then there should be a very small amount or even none of the fibres and hair samples from that night still on Kelvin's clothing some 36 hours later, let alone five weeks later. Faced with such damning scientific evidence, the defence tried to counter this during cross-examination by floating a possible theory that after von Einem's last contact with Kelvin, he had been abducted by other people, who had stored his clothing for five weeks before murdering him and re-dressing him. While the forensic scientists conceded that this was a possible scenario, under renewed cross-examination by the prosecution, they conceded that it would be still unlikely given the whole science of how fibres and hair are transferred from surface to surface over time. The prosecution then rested its case.

The defence opted for von Einem to give an unsworn statement from the dock, rather than give sworn evidence from the witness box. In his unsworn statement, von Einem detailed his alibi with what he claimed happened between 5 June and 11 July 1983. He again claimed that on 5 June he had picked up Kelvin in North Adelaide, had driven him to his home, and later had dropped him off in the Adelaide CBD. He also claimed that he was sick with the flu for the next week after that and did not return to work until 14 June. von Einem was quite sketchy on his activities after that, however he did remember what he did on 10 July, the day the body was dumped on the airstrip. He said that he was at a relative's birthday party with his mother for most of that evening, and after dropping off a friend on the way home, had gone straight to bed and then to work the next day. He also addressed the issue of the noisy exhaust on the car heard during the abduction of Kelvin, by stating that the exhaust on his Ford Falcon (which von Einem had sold on 16 July 1983, purportedly to raise money for his overseas trip) was less than two years old and in good condition. He closed his unsworn statement by again claiming his innocence.

The defence then called various witnesses in an attempt to corroborate von Einem's story. The witnesses included colleagues and friends who testified to him being unwell and at home during the first week of Kelvin's captivity. Also testifying for the defence was the bushwalker, who while walking his dogs through the airstrip had discovered Kelvin's body on 24 July. The purchaser of von Einem's Ford Falcon detailed the condition of the car, and the relative who hosted the birthday party on 10 July stated that von Einem and his mother had arrived there at 5:30pm and left at 10:30pm. Photographs of von Einem at the party were also tendered to the court. Finally, the defence called von Einem's mother to testify about her son's activities over the weekend upon which Kelvin was kidnapped. Under cross-examination, the prosecution were able to show inconsistencies in her current testimony compared to her earlier statements to police about von Einem's whereabouts on the weekend of 4–5 June, which weakened the defence case considerably as this highlighted von Einem's change the previous February of his account of what happened on the night of 5 June 1983.

In their summation, the prosecution stated that the evidence they presented proved that von Einem's story was full of lies and inconsistencies, and that he did murder (with the help of others) Kelvin. They also stated that his admission that he had picked up Kelvin showed that he was in contact with him on 5 June; that the fibres and hairs proved that von Einem was with him at the time of just before and/or at the time of death; and that the drugs proved von Einem was with Kelvin in between those times. The prosecution also answered the doubts raised by the defence about when on 10 July the body was dumped at the airstrip by suggesting that von Einem could have dumped the body sometime very late on 10 July or in the early morning of 11 July before going to work for the day.

The defence stated in their summary that the prosecution had failed to prove beyond reasonable doubt that von Einem was guilty of murder and also were not able to establish the exact cause of Kelvin's death, so therefore the jury must give von Einem the benefit of the doubt.

Mr. Justice White then gave his summation of the trial, and in the early afternoon of 5 November 1984, the jury retired to consider their verdict.

Verdict 
After 7.5 hours of deliberation, the jury returned to give their verdict. von Einem was found guilty of the murder and was automatically sentenced to life at Yatala Labour Prison. Mr. Justice White imposed a non-parole period of 24 years. Under South Australian law, a third of the non-parole period could be taken off for good behaviour in prison. Based on this reckoning, von Einem could conceivably have been eligible for parole in late 1999.

The Attorney-General of South Australia immediately appealed the leniency of the non-parole period, and on 29 March 1985 the Court of Criminal Appeal in South Australia increased the non-parole period to 36 years, a record at the time in that state. The earliest von Einem could be released on parole was therefore on 31 October 2007 (after allowing for the fact that a third of the non-parole period could be taken off for good behaviour in prison).

Von Einem's defence team (now consisting of barrister David Peek with assistance from Helena Jasinski) appealed the conviction to the Court of Criminal Appeal in South Australia and requested that a new trial be set. The basis for this appeal was the evidence given about Kelvin's heterosexuality, the references to von Einem's own homosexuality through the trial and the negative impact that might have had on the jury, and also how Mr. Justice White in his summation did not include reference to the testimony given by von Einem's relative about his attendance at the birthday party on the day Kelvin's body was dumped. The Court of Criminal of Appeal rejected the appeal, saying that the trial was conducted fairly and justly throughout; they did concede that Mr. Justice White should have included the evidence relating to the birthday party.

Additional murder charges 

Von Einem was the leading suspect in the unsolved murders of four other young men between 1979 and 1982, and police continued to pursue leads on those cases in the years after his murder conviction. The four murdered were Alan Barnes in June 1979, Neil Muir in August 1979, Peter Stogneff in August 1981 and Mark Langley in February 1982. In February 1988, the State Coroner at the time in South Australia, Kevin Ahern, ordered an inquest into the deaths of these four young men, and on 24 March 1988, the State Coroner in his findings stated that manner and circumstances in which the four were murdered were very similar to that in the case of Kelvin, particularly the murders of Barnes and Langley. The reward for any information leading to an arrest for the murders was increased to $250,000, and this was later increased to $500,000 in September 1989 and then to $1,000,000 in March 2008.

The committal hearing to determine if von Einem should stand trial for the murders of Barnes and Langley began on 5 March 1990 before magistrate David Gurry. von Einem pleaded not guilty to both murders, and his defence counsel (now consisting of barrister Mark Griffin with assistance from Marie Shaw) immediately claimed that it would be an abuse of justice for their client if he was ordered to stand trial given the mass coverage of the murders in the media in the past year. The prosecution was led again by Brian Martin QC, who was assisted this time by Tom Birchall, and their case against von Einem relied on evidence of the Kelvin murder, with the details of the crime being so strikingly similar to the murders of Barnes and Langley. The prosecution's case also relied on evidence given by former associates testifying to von  Einem picking up boys hitchhiking and sexually abusing them, as well as "Mr B"'s sensational evidence being in the company of Barnes and von Einem at the time just before Barnes's murder. "Mr B" also gave startling allegations of von Einem being involved in the unexplained Beaumont children disappearance in 1966, as well as the disappearance of two girls at the Adelaide Oval in 1973. However, it turned out to be impossible to corroborate these allegations. Another witness also came forward to claim he had seen von Einem and Barnes drinking together in the weeks before Barnes's death. Also entered as evidence were samples taken from Barnes's body which showed that sedative drugs had been present. Little evidence was presented for the murder of Langley, as prosecutors felt if they could prove that von Einem had murdered Barnes, then it would naturally follow that he had murdered Langley, as well.

On 11 May 1990, Magistrate Gurry ordered von Einem to stand trial for the two murders of Barnes and Langley. von Einem's defence counsel appealed the decision, launching an abuse of process action in the Supreme Court of South Australia to achieve a permanent stay of proceedings, as well as stating that the huge media interest in the charges would result in their client not getting a fair trial. Proceedings began on 19 June 1990 before Justice Kevin Duggan, and six months later on 17 December 1990, Justice Duggan released his findings. He ordered von Einem to stand trial; however, he expressed concerns with most of the prosecution's evidence.

The pre-trial hearing began on 19 December 1990, in the Supreme Court of South Australia, with Justice Duggan as the presiding judge. The prosecution decided after Justice Duggan's findings two days earlier to have von Einem tried separately for the murders of Barnes and Langley. Justice Duggan ruled that the evidence relating to the Kelvin murder, and from the various associates of von Einem and hitchhikers, was inadmissible. Justice Duggan did rule that "Mr B"'s evidence could be heard, but that the defence would be allowed to question the evidence as it was being given. This was a shattering blow for the prosecution's case, and on 21 December 1990, on advice from the Attorney-General of South Australia, prosecutors withdrew the charge for the murder of Langley. The prosecution tried to continue with the charge for the murder of Barnes; however, with the problems associated of getting enough evidence admitted into court from associates about von Einem picking up hitchhikers, the final charge was withdrawn on 1 February 1991. The prosecution, on the advice of the Attorney-General, then entered a nolle prosequi for the Barnes murder charge.

Later events

2006 
On 29 January 2006, the Sunday Mail reported that von Einem was currently being investigated for allegedly raping an inmate several times at Yatala Labour Prison.

On 29 October 2006, The Australian reported that von Einem had been selling hand-painted greeting cards to prison officers for $20 each.

2007 
On 4 February 2007, the ABC reported that von Einem had been charged over commercial dealings during his incarceration, including selling hand-painted greeting cards.

On 14 June 2007, the ABC reported that von Einem had been charged with producing and possessing child pornography, with police alleging that he had handwritten three fictitious stories describing sexual acts between a child and a man. His lawyer believed a handwriting analysis would clear von Einem.

On 27 July 2007 it was announced that von Einem had been transferred from the maximum security B-Division of Yatala Labour Prison to Port Augusta Prison.

On 11 August 2007, The Australian reported that detectives were calling for information to establish the identity of a young man seen in the Seven Network's news archive, showing police searching a storm water drain in the days after the Beaumont Children's disappearance. The man bore a striking resemblance to a youthful von Einem. On 13 August 2007, the Seven Network followed this with a story that the man standing next to the Einem lookalike in their archived film matched the police sketch of the suspect seen with the Beaumonts at the beach on the day of their disappearance.

On 1 November 2007, the ABC reported that after 24 years behind bars, von Einem was now eligible to apply for parole. However, South Australian Premier Mike Rann had vowed to enforce new legislation to ensure von Einem would never leave prison alive.

2008 

On 28 March 2008, the ABC reported that the child pornography found in von Einem's cell had been determined not to have been written by him and that fingerprints did not match. Defence lawyer Sam Abbott said he expected the Director of Public Prosecutions to drop the most serious charge of producing the material and, if not, he would argue there was no case to answer. It was also announced that von Einem had been excused from attending his court hearings so that he could avoid an "unpleasant" three-hour drive with other inmates.

See also 
 List of serial killers by number of victims

References

Further reading 
Bob O'Brien, Young Blood: the Story of the Family Murders, 2002

External links 
 The "Family" Murders

1946 births
21st-century Australian LGBT people
Australian murderers of children
Australian people convicted of murder
Australian prisoners sentenced to life imprisonment
Australian rapists
Crime in Oceania
Living people
People convicted of child pornography offenses
People convicted of murder by South Australia
People from Adelaide
Place of birth missing (living people)
Prisoners sentenced to life imprisonment by South Australia
Suspected serial killers